Friedrich Stahl may refer to:

Friedrich Julius Stahl (1802–1861), German constitutional lawyer, political philosopher and politician
Friedrich Stahl (officer) (1889–1979), German army officer
Friedrich Stahl, a fictional character in the German TV soap opera Storm of Love